Arthur de Oliveira Sales (born 3 July, 2002) is a Brazilian professional footballer who plays as a forward for Bahia, on loan from Belgian club Lommel.

Club career
On 31 August 2021, Sales joined Belgian First Division B side Lommel on a five-year deal. In July 2022, he joined Primeira Liga side Paços de Ferreira on a season-long loan deal.

On 9 March 2023, Arthur Sales returned to his home country after being loaned to Bahia until the end of the year.

References

External links

2002 births
Living people
Brazilian footballers
Association football forwards
CR Vasco da Gama players
Esporte Clube Bahia players
Campeonato Brasileiro Série B players
Lommel S.K. players
Brazilian expatriate footballers
Expatriate footballers in Belgium
Expatriate footballers in Portugal
Challenger Pro League players
Primeira Liga players
F.C. Paços de Ferreira players
Brazilian expatriate sportspeople in Belgium
Brazilian expatriate sportspeople in Portugal